Elachista geminatella is a moth of the family Elachistidae found in Europe.

Description
Adults are on wing in July.

The larvae feed on field wood-rush (Luzula campestris) and common woodrush (Luzula multiflora), mining the leaves of their host plant. The mine is somewhat inflated and puckered and has the appearance of a tentiform mine. Larvae can be found from autumn to spring and are greyish-white.

Distribution
It is found from Sweden to Spain and from Great Britain to the Baltic region and Austria.

References

geminatella
Leaf miners
Moths described in 1855
Moths of Europe
Taxa named by Gottlieb August Wilhelm Herrich-Schäffer